"I Never Made Love (Till I Made It with You)" is a single by American country music artist Mac Davis. It was released in April 1985 as the first single from his album Till I Made It with You. The song peaked at number 10 on the Billboard Hot Country Singles chart, making it Davis's last top-10 country hit.

Chart performance

References

1985 singles
Mac Davis songs
MCA Records singles
Songs written by Bob McDill
Song recordings produced by Jimmy Bowen
1985 songs